Mahmudabad (also Romanized as Maḩmūdābād; also known as Mahmūd Abad Arzoo’eyeh) is a village in Arzuiyeh Rural District, in the Central District of Arzuiyeh County, Kerman Province, Iran. At the 2006 census, its population was 585, in 139 families.

References 

Populated places in Arzuiyeh County